Yezhov or Ezhov is a Russian masculine surname derived from the word , meaning hedgehog; its feminine counterpart is Yezhova or Ezhova. It may refer to:

Denis Ezhov (born 1985), Russian ice hockey player
Elena Ezhova (born 1977), Ukraine-born Russian volleyball player
Elena Yezhova (1793–1853), Russian stage actress and opera singer 
Ilya Ezhov (born 1987), Russian ice hockey goaltender
Ludmila Ezhova (born 1982), Russian artistic gymnast
Nikolay Yezhov (1895–1940), Soviet secret police official 
Pyotr Yezhov (1900–1975), Russian football player
Roman Yezhov (born 1997), Russian football player
Valentin Yezhov (1921–2004), Russian screenwriter and playwright
Yekaterina Yezhova (1787–1837), Russian stage actress
Yevgeni Yezhov (born 1995), Russian football defender

Russian-language surnames